is a Japanese voice actress from the Okinawa prefecture, affiliated with Aoni Production. She debuted as a singer in 2016 by performing the opening theme song for Magic of Stella.

Filmography

Anime television
Abarenbō Rikishi!! Matsutarō (2014), Yuri
Aikatsu! (2014), Akari Ōzora (speaking voice)
Samurai Warriors (2015), Suzu
The Idolmaster Cinderella Girls (2015), Yuka Nakano
Magic of Stella (2016), Marika Shimizu
Aikatsu Stars! (2017), Akari Ōzora
Battle Girl High School (2017), Shiho Kunieda
Kemono Friends (2017), American Beaver
Restaurant to Another World (2017), Renner
Seiren (2017), Tōru Miyamae
Beatless (2018), Saturnus
Hakumei and Mikochi (2018), Mikochi
Tada Never Falls in Love (2018), Alexandra Magritte
Super Dragon Ball Heroes (2019), Lagss
Boogiepop and Others (2019), Kei Niitoki
Aikatsu on Parade! (2019), Akari Ōzora
Shadows House (2021), Shirley/Ram
The Case Study of Vanitas (2021), Lucius "Luca" Oriflamme
Selection Project (2021), Mako Toma
The World's Finest Assassin Gets Reincarnated in Another World as an Aristocrat (2021), Maha
Rumble Garanndoll (2021), Yakumo Kamizuru
Legend of Mana: The Teardrop Crystal (2022), Corona/Lisa
Farming Life in Another World (2023), Ru Rurushi
Shy (2023), Teru Momijiyama/Shy

Anime films
Girls und Panzer der Film (2015), Aki
Non Non Biyori Vacation (2018), Aoi Nizato
The Seven Deadly Sins: Grudge of Edinburgh (2022), Kurumiru

Video games
The Idolmaster Cinderella Girls: Starlight Stage (2015), Yuka Nakano
Ys VIII: Lacrimosa of Dana (2016), Quina
Xenoblade Chronicles 2 (2017), Pyra and Mythra
Fire Emblem Heroes (2017), Ash
Dynasty Warriors 9 (2018), Xin Xianying
Valkyria Chronicles 4 (2018), Ruch
Xenoblade Chronicles 2: Torna – The Golden Country (2018), Mythra
GOD EATER 3 (2018), Female Custom Voice #7
Master of Eternity (2018), Kana
Azur Lane (2019), USS Georgia
Arknights (2019), Myrtle
Tales of Arise (2021), Shionne
Super Smash Bros. Ultimate (2021), Pyra and Mythra
Tsukihime -A piece of blue glass moon- (2021), Akiha Tohno
Counter:Side (2021), Xiao Lin
Digimon Survive (2022), Floramon
Dead or Alive Xtreme Venus Vacation (2022), Shandy

Dubbing

Live-action
A Dog's Journey, Young CJ
Pet Sematary, Ellie Creed

Animation
The Addams Family 2, Peggy

References

External links
  
 

1993 births
Japanese women singers
Japanese voice actresses
Living people
Voice actresses from Okinawa Prefecture
Aoni Production voice actors
Ryukyuan people